The 2005 World Men's Handball Championship was the 19th team handball World Championship. It was played in Tunisia from 23 January to 6 February 2005.

The winner of the gold medal was Spain, Croatia took silver and France won the bronze.

Venues

Qualification

Preliminary round

Group A

Group B

Group C

Group D

Main round

Group I

Group II

Placement matches

Eleventh place game

Ninth place game

Seventh place game

Fifth place game

Final round

Bracket

Semifinals

Third place game

Final

Ranking and statistics

Final ranking

All Star Team 
 MVP:  Ivano Balić
 Goalkeeper:  Arpad Šterbik
 Left wing:  Eduard Koksharov
 Left back:  Wissem Hmam
 Centre back:  Ivano Balić
 Right back:  Mateo Garralda
 Right wing:  Mirza Džomba
 Pivot:  David Juříček

Top goalscorers 

Source: IHF

Top goalkeepers 

Source: IHF

See also 
 World Men's Handball Championship

References 
 Men's WC 2005 in Tunisia, at IHF

World Handball Championship tournaments
W
H
H
January 2005 sports events in Africa
February 2005 sports events in Africa
Sports competitions in Radès
21st century in Radès
Sports competitions in Tunis
21st century in Tunis